Zee Hindustan, a part of Essel Group, is a 24x7 national Hindi news channel. It has been launched as part of the Essel Group's efforts to establish a 'nationalist' news channel, in 2017. In 2018, the Essel Group announced that the channel would be 'anchor-less' and would present news without news anchors or news readers. The channel has faced frequent criticism and criminal complaints for sharing incorrect or misleading news.

Establishment 
In May 2017, the Essel Group, an Indian media conglomerate, launched Zee Hindustan as a "nationalist news channel," rebranding their former Zee News 24x7 programming. In December 2018, the channel was relaunched as 'anchorless,' announcing this in a front page advertisement in the newspaper, Hindustan Times.
 
The channel is currently available in several languages: Hindi, Telugu, Tamil, Kannada and Malayalam.

Controversies 
In 2018, a former civil servant filed a criminal complaint against Zee Hindustan after the broadcast of a manipulated video suggesting that some members of the Rashtriya Janata Dal, a political party, shouted 'pro-Pakistan' slogans following their victory in an election in Araria, Bihar. The complaint produced video to show that no such slogans were raised, and that issues in the lip sync in the video aired by Zee Hindustan suggested it was not authentic.

In 2019, an employee of Zee Media who was head of media content for several channels including Zee Hindustan resigned, alleging that the organization was actively portraying misleading news.

In July 2021, the Popular Front of India, a political party, filed a complaint of defamation against Zee Hindustan after a news anchor on the show claimed that they had funded efforts by Rohingya refugees in India to seek identity documents.

In September 2021, Zee Hindustan was one of several Indian channels which ran footage from the video game, Arma 3, while claiming it was real footage of the Pakistan military bombing parts of Afghanistan. Fact-checking organizations BoomLive and Altnews confirmed that it was video game footage, as did France24, a French news channel.

In April 2020, Zee Hindustan anchors falsely claimed that a British restaurant was deliberately poisoning non-Muslim customers with food contaminated by feces, and attempted to link the owners to Tablighi Jamaat, a Muslim organization, as a recent incident.. The visuals and story that they shared related to a 2015 incident in which customers (regardless of religion) fell ill after a rare strain of E.Coli was found in the lettuce used in Khyber Pass, a British restaurant, in which staff had also failed to maintain proper hand-washing protocols - an incident that was widely reported in the British press.

In June 2022, Zee Hindustan was subject to disciplinary action by the National Broadcasting and Digital Standards Authority of India, along with other news channels, India TV and Aaj Tak, after they posted sensationalist accounts of the arrest of student leader Umar Khalid, and reproduced a police account without verification or fact-checking.

In 2022, Zee Hindustan issued a formal apology and withdrew a news segment, after confirming that it consisted of a doctored video of Indian National Congress political Rahul Gandhi. Rahul Gandhi had made a public statement forgiving student activists who vandalised his office in Wayanad, Kerala. The video was shared by Zee Hindustan to falsely make it appear that Gandhi was calling for forgiveness for two Muslim persons charged with beheading a Hindu man in a case of communal violence. Following the incident, a criminal complaint was filed against Zee Hindustan and the news anchor who aired the segment, Rohit Ranjan.

References

External links
 Zee Hindustan on LyngSat
 Zee Entertainment official website
 

24-hour television news channels in India
Hindi-language television channels in India
Television channels and stations established in 2017
2017 establishments in India
Essel Group
Zee Entertainment Enterprises